Henk Bodewes (21 January 1944 - 26 July 2004) was a Dutch football manager who is last known to have managed Cape Town Spurs.

Career

In 1999, Bodewes was appointed manager of Dutch tenth division side  after working in Kenya.

In 2000, he was appointed manager of South African top flight club Cape Town Spurs, where he said, ¨“You come across things here like township boys who come to training hungry. We will give them sandwiches and milk beforehand, and vegetables and fruit afterward.¨

References

Dutch football managers
Expatriate soccer managers in South Africa
1944 births
2004 deaths
SC Veendam managers
Ajax Cape Town F.C. managers